Axel Wahlstedt (11 January 1867 – 15 December 1943) was a Swedish sports shooter. He competed in two events at the 1912 Summer Olympics.

References

External links
 

1867 births
1943 deaths
Swedish male sport shooters
Olympic shooters of Sweden
Shooters at the 1912 Summer Olympics
Sportspeople from Skåne County